Ślepowron ("night heron") may refer to:

 Ślepowron coat of arms
 Ślepowron, Masovian Voivodeship (east-central Poland)